William Kauffman Scarborough (January 17, 1933 - May 17, 2020) was a professor emeritus of history at the University of Southern Mississippi. He was the Charles W. Moorman Distinguished Alumni Professor in the Humanities from 1996 to 1998. 

He was an outspoken opponent of school integration and supporter of massive resistance, believing white people to be the "superior race" and black people to be "genetically inferior." He was a member of the Citizens' Councils.

Scarborough was a featured interviewee in the Stanley Nelson Jr. film Freedom Summer. Scarborough spoke at the Citadel on the subject of the secession of South Carolina.

Personal
Scarborough was born in Baltimore, Maryland. He earned his B.A at the University of North Carolina, Chapel Hill in 1954. He served in the Navy 1954-56 as a gunnery officer on the USS New Jersey (BB-62).  He earned his M.A. at Cornell and his doctorate at the University of North Carolina, Chapel Hill in 1962. He taught for a year at Northeast Louisiana University before taking employment at Southern Miss, where he remained. The records of his work, 27 feet and 8500 documents, including materials associated with the Citizens' Councils, are archived at the University of North Carolina libraries.

Scarborough died in May 2020.

Selected publications
 Heritage, not hate. Let's keep the state flag
Overseer: Plantation Management in the Old South
 Masters of the Big House: Elite Slaveholders of the Mid-Nineteenth-Century South
 Slavery — The White Man's Burden

References

1933 births
2020 deaths
University of North Carolina at Chapel Hill alumni
Education segregation in Mississippi
Cornell University alumni
Neo-Confederates
Citizens' Councils
People from Baltimore